An American Tail: The Computer Adventures of Fievel and His Friends is a 1993 point-and-click adventure game by Capstone Software and Manley & Associates, Inc for DOS, based on both of the first two movies, An American Tail and An American Tail: Fievel Goes West. The game's manual included a glossary to define difficult words for younger players. In 1994 the game was released with Trolls and Rock-A-Doodle Computerized Coloring Book on the Capstone CD Game Kids Collection.

Gameplay
The player guides Fievel Mousekewitz to find and protect his family. The gameplay is a simplified click and point set of options without any deaths or dead ends. Whenever the mouse pointer is placed over a particular something, the icon changes to indicate that an appropriate action will take place to correspond with that icon, such as talking to characters, picking up items, looking at objects and going to another location. When talking to a character, the player will have multiple dialogue responses to choose from. Clicking on Fievel himself allows the player to give one or more items from his inventory to a character on screen. Throughout the game, the player must solve some mini-games to gain required items. Losing a mini-game has no consequence but requires the player to try again until the game is won by Fievel.

Development
The game made use of digitized scenes straight from the first two films and was presented to the Chicago 1992 Summer Electronics Show.

Reception
Judy Muldawer reviewed the game for Computer Gaming World, and stated that "Solving these adventures promotes a feeling of accomplishment. However, because it is so difficult to assess any one age group as a target for An American Tail, the best use of this adventure game for children might be to share it as a group experience. In this way, children and adults can assist one another and, together, share the joy of accomplishment when the adventure is completed. I recommend this game as a family project for parents and children of elementary school age."

References

External links
 

1993 video games
Adventure games
An American Tail (franchise)
DOS games
DOS-only games
Point-and-click adventure games
Video games about mice and rats
Video games based on films
Video games developed in the United States